Beth Jane Porter (born May 23, 1942) is an American stage, film and television actress and writer, who has worked in Britain for most of her career. She became a British citizen in 2014.

Early life
Beth Porter made her first professional appearance at age 12 in a Westchester County touring company. She studied acting on scholarship at the Stratford Connecticut Shakespeare Festival and with Helen Menken at the American Theatre Wing before completing dramatic studies at Bard College, New York University, and Hunter College at The City University of New York [CUNY].

Career
After appearing in the American premiere of Jules Romains's Donogoo in 1961 at the Greenwich Mews Theatre, Isaac Babel's Sunset at the Chelsea Theater Center in 1966, and later that year as the star of David Starkweather's Ascent at The Playwrights Workshop, Porter was chosen as a member of original Obie Award-winning New York LaMaMa Troupe under director Tom O'Horgan (Hair), where she starred in the play and later film of Futz!, and featured in Paul Foster's Tom Paine and Melodrama Play by Sam Shepard. A critic declared of her co-starring role in Futz!: "Beth Porter makes the Whore of Babylon look like the Singing Nun."

Ellen Stewart and Tom O'Horgan invited Porter and her Scots husband Peter Reid to co-found the first foreign branch of La MaMa Experimental Theatre Club, based in the UK. Known as The Wherehouse La MaMa with Porter as its administrative director, it operated as a touring company throughout Europe and guest appearing at La MaMa New York. Porter featured in their plays, including Groupjuice, Little Mother by Ross Alexander, The Hilton Keen Show, Hump, a dramatization of the novel by David Benedictus.

US television guest spots include Baretta and Kojak.

UK television roles include Thames Television's Armchair Theatre play, Verité (1973) with Richard Morant and Tim Curry, co-starring in Rock Follies of '77 (1977) and Hitchhiker's Guide to the Galaxy, in which she reprised her role as The Marketing Girl from the original radio series. Her television films include Blue Money,  again with Tim Curry, and Pleasure (1994), part of the Alan Bleasdale Presents series. She guest starred with Bill Nighy in The Men's Room (1991).

Feature film roles include Reds (1981), Mrs. McKee in The Great Gatsby (1974), sister-in-law Anna to Woody Allen’s Boris in Love and Death (1975), and Yentl (1983), in which she worked as Barbra Streisand's understudy and played Sophie, Amy Irving's maid in an uncredited role. She appeared in several saucy UK comedies in the 1970s including Eskimo Nell (1975), an early feature film by Martin Campbell.

Voice acting
Porter featured on Roger Waters' album The Pros and Cons of Hitch Hiking as The Wife. Her voice has been heard on re-voices and dubbings of many films. She was the White Witch in the animated version of The Lion, the Witch and the Wardrobe. She and John Ratzenberger did all the post-synch voices in John Schlesinger's Honky Tonk Freeway (1981).

Later career
Porter later trained as a television script editor and producer. For BBC Television, she produced The Husband, The Wife and The Stranger, starring Adam Faith and Derrick O'Connor, and for Channel 4 Television, Unusual Ground Floor Conversion, a short film directed by Mark Herman, Little Voice. She later joined BBC Television Drama as a development executive for new drama series.

A number of her radio plays and short stories have been broadcast on BBC Radio 4.

Porter first became a journalist at age 12 when she was hired as a weekly columnist for The Patent Trader, a Westchester County newspaper chain. Years later, she served as a relief theatre critic for The Times, and contributed media-related articles to The Listener, The Guardian, and The Independent. In 1988 she became a film critic, joining The Critics' Circle and served for 10 years as London Editor for Film Journal International, with supplementary pieces for The Morning Star. Until May 2020, she continued to provide online columns for The London Progressive Journal under the byline outRageous!

She subsequently became a senior Web Producer for leading web-house Online Magic, part of the Omnicom Group, and she was asked to contribute to various web-related magazines including .net for Future Publishing. This led to the publication of her book, The Net Effect, for which David Puttnam contributed the foreword. 2018 was her 21st year as a nominating judge for the International Webby Awards and she has served as a contributor to policy advisers on eDemocracy issues. She is an elected Lifetime voting member of BAFTA.

In 2013 she published Resident Aliens, a collection of her short fiction for kindle. This was followed in 2014 by a collection of her original scripts and screenplays under the umbrella title Drama Queen and in April 2016 of her autobiography entitled Walking on my Hands: how I learned to take responsibility for my life with the help of Woody Allen, Barbra Streisand, Greta Garbo, Harvey Milk, Idi Amin, Guy The Gorilla, and Frank Sinatra, among others. Its foreword is by noted author and screenplay writer Shane Connaughton (My Left Foot).

Also in 2016 Porter published both kindle and paperback versions of Settling Beyond the Pale, a novella and six short stories about freedom and flight.

In 2018 Porter released both kindle and paperback versions of a horror/fantasy novella titled Feeding the Twins as well as her first novel ScreenSaver!

Porter's second novel, Becca’s Providing, was published in both kindle and paperback during the spring of 2019; it explores themes of identity and family. Porter's 3rd collection of short fiction was published in December 2019, under the title Painted Ladies.

In March 2021, Porter published Locks: a quartet of short fiction in paperback and Kindle. Her Amazon profile further stated that she was working on a collection of short and flash fiction featuring female protagonists for publication in early 2022, and was also preparing a new book promo website.

Filmography

Films

Television

References

External links

   
 

1942 births
Living people
Actresses from New York City
American film actresses
American stage actresses
American television actresses
American expatriate actresses in the United Kingdom
American emigrants to England
Naturalised citizens of the United Kingdom
BBC television producers
American women television producers